The  is a compact crossover SUV that has been manufactured by Subaru since 1997. The first generation was built on the platform of the Impreza in the style of a taller station wagon, a style that continued to the second generation, while the third-generation model onwards moved towards a crossover SUV design. A performance model was available for the second-generation Forester in Japan as the Forester STi.



First generation (SF; 1997)

The Forester was introduced at the Tokyo Motor Show in November 1995 as the Streega concept, and available for sale in February 1997 in Japan, and to the US market in 1997 for MY1998. The Forester was one of the first crossover SUVs; the idea was inspired by Volkswagen (VW). It was built in the style of a station wagon, but had a taller stance, higher h-point seating, and an all-wheel drive drivetrain. Subaru advertising employed the slogan "SUV tough, Car Easy".

Japan
In its domestic market, the Forester replaced the Impreza Gravel Express, known in the US as the Subaru Outback Sport. However, the Outback Sport remained in production for the U.S. market. The Forester appeared after the introduction of the Nissan Rasheen in Japan with a similar appearance, and the Forester's Japanese competitors include the Toyota RAV4, Mitsubishi RVR, and the Suzuki Grand Vitara. Because of the Forester's low center of gravity, it meets the United States federal safety standards for passenger vehicles and does not require a "risk of rollover" warning label on the driver's visor. Size- and price-wise, it fits between the shared Impreza platform and the larger Legacy.

The automatic transmissions used on AWD-equipped vehicles will normally send 60% of the engine's torque to the front wheels and 40% to the rear wheels, using a computer-controlled, continuously variable, multi-plate transfer clutch. When the transmission detects a speed difference between the front and rear axle sets, the transmission progressively sends power to the rear wheels. Under slip conditions, it can achieve an equal split in front and rear axle speeds.

When accelerating or driving uphill, the vehicle's weight shifts rearward, reducing front-wheel traction, causing the transmission to automatically send torque to the rear wheels to compensate. When braking or driving downhill, the vehicle's weight shifts towards the front, reducing rear-wheel traction. The transmission again compensates by sending torque to the front wheels for better steering control and braking performance. If the automatic is placed in reverse or first gear, the transmission divides the torque 50/50 to both front and rear wheels.   The manual transmission cars are set up with a near 50/50 torque split as a base setting, and it varies from there. Essentially, manual cars are set up with more bias towards the rear than automatic cars.

Australia

United States
The U.S. market first got the car starting in 1997 with either the 2.5-liter DOHC (MY1998 only), and in 1999+ models changed to a 2.5-liter SOHC naturally aspirated engine (no turbocharged engines). In 2000, for MY2001, Subaru updated the exterior with a modest facelift to the front, rear, sides, and the interior's dashboard.

The trim levels were the basic model "L" and the fully equipped "S" for the USA versions.

Forester L came with a high level of standard equipment, including ABS, air conditioning, power windows, power locks, cruise control, digital temperature gauge, multi-reflector halogen headlights, fog lights, roof rack, rear window defogger, trailer harness connector, reclining front bucket seats with adjustable lumbar support, tilt steering, tinted glass, AM/FM/cassette stereo with its antenna laminated in the left-rear quarter window. Notably new in 2001 were the three-point seatbelts for all five seating positions, including force limiters in front and height-adjustable shoulder belt anchors for front and rear outboard positions, plus rear seat headrests for all three seating positions.

Forester S adds a viscous limited-slip differential for the 2000 Model Year, rear disc brakes, 16 × 6.5-inch alloy wheels with 215/60R16 tires (the L uses 15 × 6-inch steel wheels), upgraded moquette upholstery, heated front seats with net storage pockets in back, dual vanity mirrors, heated side-view mirrors, heated windshield wipers, and keyless entry. New equipment for 2001 included Titanium pearl paint for the bumpers and cladding; six-disc in-dash CD sound system; leather-wrapped steering wheel, shift knob, and handbrake handle; variable intermittent wipers with de-icers and driver's side fin; and the five-spoke alloy wheels. Some models were equipped with the $1,000 optional premium package on the Forester S, including monotone paint (Sedona Red Pearl), power moonroof, front side-impact airbags, and gold accent wheels. Other options were the $800 automatic transmission, $39 chrome tailpipe cover, and $183 auto-dimming rear-view mirror with compass, bringing the sticker price to $25,412 including $495 delivery (U.S. dollars quoted).

Second generation (SG; 2002)

The second generation was introduced as a 2003 model at the 2002 Chicago Auto Show, based on the new Impreza platform, featuring several fine-tune improvements over the past model. The 2003 Forester features weight-saving refinements such as an aluminum hood, perforated rails, and a hydro-formed front sub-frame. The most noticeable change was the offering of 2.5 L versions (normally aspirated and turbocharged) and in the U.S. the introduction of the turbocharged 2.5-liter model.

In the United States, the naturally aspirated X (previously L) and XS (previously S) were released in 2003. In 2004, the turbocharged XT trim was released. However, the same model had been available since the late 1990s elsewhere in the world. The X and XS models feature a 2.5 L SOHC EJ253 engine, while the XT model features a 2.5 L turbocharged DOHC engine. Both engines have timing belt (camshaft). The XT model uses the same Mitsubishi Motors TD04 turbocharger used in the Subaru Impreza WRX. All Forester 2.5 L engines are of the interference engine type.

Starting with the 2004 XT, the turbocharged version had Active valve control system cylinder heads. The i-AVLS (active valve lift system) became standard on the naturally aspirated version of the Forester in 2006. This increased horsepower and torque figures to 173 HP and 166 ft-lbs. The 2006 XT received a higher compression ratio to 8.4:1 from 8.2:1. This increased the XT's power to 230 HP and 235 ft-lbs.

For the 2006 model year, Subaru gave the SG Forester a facelift, using redesigned headlights, tail lights, bonnet, grille, front bumper, and side moldings.

Safety
MY03-04 Models has a 4-Star ANCAP safety rating. MY05 Forester Model had a mid-life update, which increased its ANCAP safety rating to 5 Stars.

In 2006, the turbocharged engine (powering the Forester XT) was awarded International Engine of the Year. This engine is also used in the Subaru Impreza WRX, as well as the re-badged Saab 9-2X Aero.

Maintenance
All of the 2.5-liter 4-cylinder engines for this generation have a timing belt made of rubber and cord. These engines are interference engines, meaning that if the timing belt breaks or stretches, the pistons will hit the valves, requiring an engine teardown, and a likely rebuild. Also, if this belt is replaced around 105,000 miles, it is a good idea to change the water pump, thermostat, belt tensioner and all the idler pulleys for this belt. The water pump and thermostat are behind this belt.
In Australia for the Series II (MY06) cars, Subaru changed the recommended service interval for the timing belt replacement from 100,000 kilometers to 125,000 kilometers.
The 2.5-liter 4-cylinder engine in the first-generation Foresters featured head gaskets which were prone to premature failure. For 2003 and later, this problem was addressed with a revised, higher performing design, but is still a problem.

United States

For the U.S. market, the car was offered with either the 2.5 SOHC naturally aspirated engine, or the 2.5 DOHC turbocharged version
added in 2004. In 2005, the L.L. Bean edition was added. In 2006, the styling was updated, Active valve lift system was added to non-turbo engines to improve power and efficiency, the XS model was deleted, and the Premium model was added. In 2007, a bottle holder was added to front door panels, the 'Sports' trim level was added, which changed some interior and exterior features and added the VDT/VDC transmission to the XT Sports turbo Automatic model. In 2008, TPMS was added, the L.L. Bean model deleted rear load-leveling suspension but gained a radio upgrade, and the XT Turbo Limited models got the VDT/VDC Auto transmission.

Australia

The Forester had three main models available in Australia until July 2005, which are X, XS and XT.

India
The Forester was sold in India by General Motors India as the Chevrolet Forester. Introduced in 2003, it was the first Chevrolet-badged model released in India, as previous GM models are badged as Opels. Sales of the Chevrolet Forester ended in 2007 since General Motors no longer holds an ownership stake in Subaru's parent company, Fuji Heavy Industries.

China
A look-alike was produced by Yema Auto and known as the Yema F99 in China. It was a similar design to the pre-facelifted model. Production ran from 2012 to 2014. The engine was a 1.5l 4 cylinder mated to a 5-speed manual gearbox. The car was not related to the Forester even though they look very similar. The Forester was imported to China from 2004 until 2007 in the following models:

2004 Version sold in China:
2.5XT Automatic

2006 Version (Facelift) sold in China:
2.0X Manual
2.0X Automatic
2.5XT Automatic

2007 Version (Facelift) sold in China:
2.0X Manual
2.0X Automatic
2.5XT Automatic

Forester STi (SF and SG; 2004) 

In 2004, Subaru launched the Forester STi for the Japanese market only. A "sportier" version of the standard second-gen (SG) Forester, the Forester STi incorporated most of the running components from the WRX STi, with several other changes. It was never sold outside of Japan.

The Forester STi exterior was modified with additions such as a redesigned front fascia with new headlights, front bumper, grille and "STi" badged covered fog lights, like those seen on the Impreza WRX STi. The rear fascia was also redesigned with revised taillights, a revised rear bumper, and an added rear spoiler.

Multiple changes were made to the engine and the mechanical components of the Forester to create the Forester STi. They include the engine, which received the 2.5-liter turbocharged flat-four from the WRX STi, making  and 186.0 lb-ft of torque. A six-speed manual gearbox, a larger intercooler, and a low-back-pressure exhaust system were also added. The top three ratios of the gearbox are 14 percent taller to match the engine's torque curve.

To cope with the extra power made by the new engine, the Forester STi got many upgraded suspension components including STi sport springs, revised struts at each corner, and bigger anti-roll bars and cross-members. These changes resulted in a 1.2 inch lower ride height and improved resistance to torsional forces. Rolling resistance was also improved, but the higher center of gravity of the Forester still remained. The Forester STi is also equipped with a new rack with a quicker ratio that leads to a more deliberate turn-in.

The Forester STi got 18-inch, 10-spoke alloy wheels with 225/45R-18 Bridgestone Potenza tires. Four-piston Brembo brakes are employed on the front wheels, and two-piston units are used on the back. It also has special STi bucket seats with red inserts, a smaller leather steering wheel, and a shift knob with red stitching.

Third generation (SH; 2008) 

The third-generation Forester began to move away from a traditional wagon design towards becoming a crossover SUV. It was larger in nearly every dimension and featured a sloping roofline with more cargo space. Subaru unveiled the model year 2008 Forester in Japan on December 25, 2007. The North American version made its debut at the 2008 North American International Auto Show in Detroit.

Styling was by Subaru Chief Designer Mamoru Ishii. The dimensions derive from engineers using the basic body structure of the Japanese-spec Impreza wagon with the rear platform of the U.S.-spec Impreza sedan.

The independent double-wishbone rear suspension was redesigned for better handling and a smoother ride. A "Sportshift" mode was added to the four-speed computer-controlled automatic transmission. The in-dash, touch-screen satellite navigation system became Bluetooth compatible, and integrated with a premium stereo. A six-speaker surround sound enhancement was optional.

The new model added  to the Forester's wheelbase, improving interior space and cargo room ( expandable to ).

Europe 
The Forester was available in Europe from 2008 with either the 2.0-liter EJ20 196 Nm gasoline engine with Active Valve Control System (AVCS) matched to either five-speed manual or four-speed automatic gearbox, or an all-new diesel-powered horizontally opposed Subaru EE boxer engine, and six-speed manual gearbox. The new model was introduced at the 2008 Paris Motor Show in October. The EE20 diesel engine in the Euro 4 guise was plagued by crankshaft failure caused by cracks forming when operated in cold climate. Although Subaru never acknowledged this defect, the engine was reworked for the Euro 5 model in 2011 to eliminate this issue.

In the UK, the gasoline-powered Forester was offered in the popular X and XS models, while the trim levels for the diesel models were X, XC, and XS NavPlus.

In Russia, Belarus, and Ukraine 2.5 and 2.5 Turbo engines were also available.

In the Netherlands, the Forester is offered with gasoline or diesel engines. The gasoline engine can also be fitted with an additional liquefied petroleum gas installation (LPG), an aftermarket installation provided directly through dealerships. The available equipment levels are Intro (gasoline engine only), Comfort, Luxury, Premium, and XT (gasoline engine turbo). Maximum towing abilities for the gasoline or gasoline with LPG are 2000 kg (manual) or 1500 kg (auto), while the manual-only diesel can tow 2000 kg.

Australia

There were seven specifications with various trim and performance levels:
X: Base model - naturally aspirated 2.5 L flat-4,  229 Nm (169 ft-lbf)
XS: Lower luxury non-turbo model - naturally aspirated 2.5 L flat-4,  229 Nm (169 ft-lbf)
XS Premium: luxury non-turbo model - naturally aspirated 2.5 L flat-4,  229 Nm (169 ft-lbf)
2.0 Diesel: turbo-diesel 2.0 L flat-4,  350 Nm (258 ft-lbf)
2.0 Premium Diesel: Premium - turbo-diesel 2.0 L flat-4,  350 Nm (258 ft-lbf)
XT: Lower luxury turbo model - turbocharged 2.5 L flat-4,  320 Nm (236 ft-lbf)
XT Premium: luxury turbo model - turbocharged 2.5 L flat-4,  320 Nm (236 ft-lbf)
S-Edition: - turbocharged 2.5 L flat-4  347 Nm (256 ft-lbf)
Of note is a serious head gasket issue that remains unresolved by Subaru. Mostly oil and or coolant leaks / cross cylinder failure being the worst. It can be resolved by aftermarket gaskets, however, this is an expensive engine-out job.

Summary of standard trim and equipment over different Australian models.
 Wheels and tires – The X model came with 16-inch steel wheels, the 2.0 diesel model with 16-inch alloys, all other models came with 17-inch alloy wheels. The S-Edition comes with STi-style wheels.
 Suspension – The X model came with double-wishbone type, independent rear suspension. All other models came with self-leveling double-wishbone type, independent suspension on the rear.
 Miscellaneous – The Premium versions of the 2.0 diesel, XS, and XT models came with leather seating and an electric sunroof. These items were not available as options on other models.
 Transmission. The X came with either a dual-range, five-speed manual transmission or a four-speed automatic transmission. Both diesel models come with a six-speed manual transmission only. All other models came with either a single-range, five-speed manual or four-speed automatic transmission. The S-Edition has a 5-speed Automatic Transmission.
 Entertainment – The XT Premium came with a multi-information in-dash satellite navigation system and a single CD/DVD player (7-inch touch screen). The X and 2.0 diesel came with an AM/FM radio, CD player (MP3 and WMA compatible), four-speaker stereo (tweeters and subwoofer optional extra). All other models came with an AM/FM radio, a six-stack in-dash CD player (MP3 and WMA compatible), and a six-speaker SRS stereo system with a subwoofer. The system from the XT Premium was optional on all other models, but cost A$4851.50 (fitted).

United States
The Forester trim levels were the 2.5X Limited, the 2.5X Premium, the 2.5X, and the 2.5XT Limited and 2.5XT Premium both with turbo. The interior color was either black or light gray, with three upholstery selections, including leather. Nine exterior colors were offered, with four colors in a pearlescent appearance.

Starting July 2009, Subaru no longer offered a special-edition L.L. Bean trim level on the Forester. The Subaru Elaion is a modified Subaru Forester which was built by Subaru and Elaion (Repsol-YPF).

The USA 2.5X model was certified PZEV emissions (Rated  instead ), with a badge attached to the rear of the vehicle on the bottom right-hand side of the tailgate. All other USA models were certified LEV2. The PZEV Forester was available for sale in all fifty states, unlike other manufacturers who only sold PZEV-certified vehicles in states that had adopted California emission standards. The engine without the turbo runs on unleaded gasoline rated at 87 octane, and the turbo engine (EJ255) requires premium fuel rated minimum 91 octane.

Safety equipment included front airbags with side curtain airbags and front passenger-side airbags (for a total of six airbags) and brake assist that detects panic-braking situations and applies maximum braking force more quickly. The five-speed manual transmission was equipped with Incline Start Assist.

Some of the standard equipment found on the 2.5X included Subaru's VDC (Vehicle Dynamics Control), 16 inch steel wheels, and an auxiliary audio jack for MP3 players. Optional equipment included 17 inch alloy wheels, panoramic moonroof, heated front seats, and heated side-view mirrors. The L.L. Bean edition added automatic climate control, leather upholstery, an upgraded stereo with six speakers and a six-disc in-dash CD changer over the four-speaker stereo with single-disc CD player, and an in-dash navigation system, as well as L.L. Bean signature floor mats and rear cargo tray.

The 2.5 XT came with the premium stereo standard, as well as 17-inch alloy wheels, and the panoramic moonroof. The 2.5 XT Limited added leather upholstery with heated front seats, in-dash navigation, a rear spoiler, and automatic climate control. For 2009, XT models came only with a four-speed automatic with Sport Shift.

Forester XTI concept
The Forester XTI concept vehicle used the 2.5-liter inter-cooled turbo engine from the Subaru WRX STI, six-speed manual transmission, 18 × 8-inch S204 forged alloy wheels with Yokohama Advan Neova 255/40R18 performance tires, adjustable coil-over suspension, Brembo brakes with four-piston front calipers, 2-piston rear calipers, SuperSport ABS and Electronic Brake-force Distribution (EBD), leather and Alcantara sport seats, a special instrument cluster, front dash, and center console and leather-wrapped steering wheel. Engine is rated  and  torque.

The vehicle was unveiled in the 2008 SEMA Show.

Mountain Rescue Vehicle
Subaru produced a specialized vehicle for the National Ski Patrol based on the 2.5XT turbo. It includes diamond plate floor, rear steel walls, a 9,500-pound winch and a roof-mounted toboggan. The vehicle was unveiled in the 2008 SEMA Show.

Facelift 
In 2010 (U.S. model year 2011), the Subaru Forester received a minor facelift featuring a new grille insert and several small changes in various trim levels. A new 2.5X Touring trim level was also introduced above the 2.5X Limited. The 2.5X Touring trim added HID lighting, a rearview camera, dual-zone climate control, and silver roof rails. 2.5XT models got a slightly larger rear roof spoiler.

Subaru also quietly switched to the all-new 2.5L DOHC FB25 third-generation boxer engine in naturally aspirated Forester models. Fuel economy improved by 1 mpg EPA city/highway to 21/27. 2.5XT models retained the 2.5L DOHC EJ255 turbo engine.

Fourth generation (SJ; 2012)

The fourth-generation Forester was unveiled in the 2012 Guangzhou Motor Show, followed by the 2013 New York International Auto Show.

The fourth-generation model had a major revamp of interior comfort. The passenger seat is higher, the sound system has been upgraded, the rear bench seats are higher and the console is re-positioned for the person riding in the center. The manual transmission models were also upgraded to a six-speed transmission instead of the previous generation's five-speed transmission.

Changes to the line-up include:
 Continuously Variable Transmission and decreased towing capacity. Turbocharged variants use a high-torque CVT with steering wheel paddle shifter controls.
 Revised, sport-oriented suspension, wheels (18-inch), and chassis bracing for XT (turbo) variant, providing flatter cornering in turns and better handling overall with little impact on the ride.
 Increased fuel economy, up to 32 mpg (7.35 L/100 km) highway (EPA rated)
 1.4 inches longer, 0.6 inches wider, 1 inch longer wheelbase
New option on higher end CVT models is "X-MODE" AWD control system, which was developed for driving on uneven or slippery road conditions. Engine, Transmission and VDC are controlled cooperatively.
New option on top-of-the-line 2.5i and 2.0XT Touring models only: EyeSight Driver Assist System

Japan models went on sale in November 2012. Early model includes 2.0i, 2.0i-L, 2.0i-L EyeSight, 2.0i-S EyeSight, 2.0XT (280 PS), 2.0XT EyeSight (280 PS). 2.0i engine models include six-speed manual (2.0i, 2.0i-L) or Lineartronic CVT transmission; 2.0XT (280 PS) engine models include Lineartronic CVT transmission.

Asian models went on sale in March 2013 as 2014 model year. Early model includes 2.0i-L, 2.0i Premium and 2.0XT. Association of Southeast Asian Nations production of the Subaru Forester began in February 2016. Malaysia-based Tan Chong Motor Assemblies assembled approximately 10,000 Forester units annually for Malaysia, Thailand and Indonesia respectively.

US models went on sale in March 2013 as 2014 model year vehicles. Early models include 2.5i in base, Premium, Limited and top-line Touring versions, and performance-oriented turbocharged 2.0XT (253 PS) in Premium and Touring versions. Base and Premium model 2014 Foresters can be equipped with the manual six-speed transmission or the Lineartronic CVT. All other models are equipped with the Lineartronic CVT. An option on Limited/Touring 2.5i and Premium/Touring 2.0XT is new X-Mode control and Hill Descent Control (HDC) features. These are not available on other models.

The 2014 Forester has a new feature called X Mode that allows owners to go through more extreme conditions both on the road and off. The concept is that any driver, regardless of skill level, can drive safely on wet roads or muddy areas. It works by monitoring wheel-slip on all four wheels; should one or more wheels begin to slip, X Mode kicks in and applies the brakes to the affected wheel which results in a transfer of power to the opposite wheel. After it is engaged by a simple push button, X Mode stays engaged up until the vehicle's speed is about  then disengages itself.

It has been awarded Motor Trend's 2009 and 2014 SUV of the Year and The Car Connection's Best Car To Buy 2014.

Safety

According to IIHS (Insurance Institute for Highway Safety), the 2014 Forester achieved Good crash test ratings in Small Overlap Front, Moderate Overlap Front, Side, Roof Strength, and Head Restraining & Seats categories. The Forester had not been rated Good in the Small Overlap Front test until modifications were made for the 2014 model year. The small overlap test, introduced in 2012 by the IIHS, simulates a frontal collision on 25 percent of the driver's side front corner. Since its adoption, the IIHS has noticed several automakers making non-symmetrical modifications to their vehicles. Another small overlap test was conducted on a number of vehicles, including a 2014 Forester, but was conducted on the passenger side instead. The crash test showed substantially more intrusion into the passenger side than into the driver's side of the Forester, it would have been rated Marginal

EyeSight Driver Assist System

The 2014 top-of-the-line Touring model Forester in the U.S. offers Subaru's EyeSight driver assist technology that uses stereoscopic CCD cameras mounted on either side of the rearview mirror. Eyesight offers several driver assist technologies/features which include:
 Pre-Collision Braking System
 Pre-Collision Throttle Management
 Adaptive Cruise Control
 Lane Departure and Sway Warning

The system can be manually turned on or off. Being an optical, instead of radar, based system, it has limitations in limited visibility situations; driving into the sun, fog, or where the windshield is not cleared (snow, mud, etc.) may cause the system to disengage.

Facelift 
The facelifted fourth-generation Forester was revealed in October 2015 ahead of the 2015 Tokyo Motor Show. Changes include new LED projector headlights with C-shaped positioning lights, new taillights, a redesigned grille and a reprofiled front bumper.

Subaru also introduced improvements to the Forester's AWD chassis and NVH. It also feature greater front cross member rigidity and optimisation of the rear trailing link bushings which result in better steering response and straight-line stability. The turbo model gets Active Torque Vectoring. Ride comfort has been improved with optimised dampers and spring rates, while thicker door glass, stronger sealing, additional under-floor insulation and improvements to the Lineartronic CVT gearbox result in quieter ride. The FB 2.0-liter naturally-aspirated flat-four petrol engine with  has been given more efficient combustion and reduced friction for better fuel efficiency with no loss of performance.

The Forester uses color cameras for the EyeSight system with a wider and longer field of view. Alongside EyeSight which was upgraded to Version 3, Subaru offered a Rear Vehicle Detection package that includes Blind Spot Detection, Lane Change Assist and Rear Cross Traffic Alert. The stereo cameras of Eyesight also double up as the eyes for Adaptive Driving Beam.

In the U.S., the facelift was introduced in April 2016 for the 2017 model year.

Engines

Fifth generation (SK; 2018)

The fifth-generation Forester was revealed on March 28, 2018, at the New York International Auto Show. Like contemporary Subaru models, the fifth-generation model moved the Forester to the Subaru Global Platform. The new platform is said to provide greater handling capability, agility, ride comfort and crash protection. It is also claimed to be inherently resistant to noise, vibration and harshness (NVH).

While sporting design cues from the previous generation, the fifth-generation Forester incorporates Subaru's "Dynamic x Solid" recent design language. Wider rear door openings and a steeper C-pillar allow for easier entry and egress and also makes installing a child seat easier.

The reworked front seats are claimed to be more comfortable on long trips. Subaru also included an electric parking brake which frees up center console space.

North America 
Initial trim levels available in the U.S. and Canada are Base, Premium, Sport, Limited and Touring. All Foresters sold in the U.S. come standard with Subaru's Eyesight Driver Assist Technology. Subaru DriverFocus Distraction Mitigation System comes standard on the Touring trim in the U.S., which provides an alert when it detects the driver is distracted or is drowsy. In addition, the DriverFocus system is able to recognize five different drivers and will set seat and mirror positions and climate control settings accordingly.

As standard, the Forester comes with the Starlink Multimedia system with a 6.5-inch touchscreen.

In North America, the model is only available with one engine type: Subaru's new FB25 DI.

All fifth-generation Foresters have one of three versions of Subaru's Symmetrical All Wheel Drive system. The trim levels in North America determines which system is installed. The Base trim received a Variable Torque Distribution (VTD) using electronically controlled clutches to control torque split. Premium, Sport, Limited and Touring trims receive the driver-selectable X-Mode system with Hill Descent Control, which optimises engine, transmission, AWD system and Vehicle Dynamics Control for maximum traction on slippery conditions. A new dual-mode version with Snow/Dirt and Deep Snow/Mud modes is fitted on Sport, Limited and Touring variants. All models provide a nominal torque split biased 60 front to 40 rear.

Forester e-Boxer

Subaru introduced the e-Boxer hybrid powertrain for the European-market Forester and XV at the Geneva Motor Show in March 2019; the e-Boxer integrates an electric motor into the Lineartronic CVT to improve fuel economy and increase power.

Like the first-generation XV Crosstrek Hybrid, the Forester e-Boxer adds a single electric motor rated at  maximum output. The battery for the traction motor is placed above the rear axle, improving the front/rear weight balance.

Forester Sport
A Forester Sport with a CB18 1.8-liter direct injection turbocharged flat-4 engine was introduced in October 2020 for the Japanese domestic market. This engine is also present in the JDM-only Subaru Levorg. With the introduction of the Sport, the FB20D e-BOXER became the standard engine across the rest of the Forester line in Japan. , there are no reports whether other markets will receive the CB18.

The Forester Sport is identified by its black grille as well as grey-painted fog lamps covers, side mirrors and rocker panels. The Sport also is equipped with a set of dark 18-inch wheels, while the rear fascia adds additional trim around the tailgate window. It is also equipped with dual exhaust outlets, which are part of a redesigned and sportier lower apron.

Facelift 
The facelifted model was released for North America in September 2021 for the 2022 model year. It had a new front end as well as a slightly tweaked rear bumper while the powertrain was unchanged. All Forester models have Subaru's updated fourth-generation eyesight driver-assist system. An off-road-focused Wilderness model was also introduced.

Forester Wilderness
Alongside the facelift model, Subaru released a new model called the Forester Wilderness for the North American market. It is intended to be a more off-road-oriented version of the Forester, and is positioned between the Limited and Touring trim levels in the Forester lineup. Visually, the Forester has more body cladding, and on the inside, copper-colored accents. Subaru's StarTex water-repellent seats are also standard.

The Wilderness is powered by the same 2.5-liter FB25D naturally-aspirated four cylinder engine powering other North American market Foresters. The Wilderness uses an Enhanced Dual-Function X-Mode version. The X-Mode is upgraded and re-tuned, with settings for snow, dirt, deep snow and mud. Additional wheel-slip is allowed to occur, which provides an advantage in harsh driving conditions.

Awards
 Car and Drivers 5Best Trucks 2004, 2005, 2006
 Winner of Wheels Gold star cars award for best compact SUV 2008
 Winner of Motor Trend magazine's Sport/Utility of the Year Award in 2009
 Best Small Utility in MotorWeek's 2009 Driver's Choice Awards
 Winner of Motor Trend Magazine's SUV of the Year Award in 2014
 Insurance Institute for Highway Safety Top Safety Pick+
 Subaru Forester Claims Top Honours as AJAC's 2017 Canadian Utility Vehicle of the Year
Winner of New Zealand Motoring Writers Guild Car of the Year Award in 2018

Sales

References

External links

Official website

Forester
Crossover sport utility vehicles
All-wheel-drive vehicles
2000s cars
2010s cars
Cars introduced in 1997
Cars powered by boxer engines
Partial zero-emissions vehicles
Vehicles with CVT transmission